The 2017–18 Dayton Flyers women's basketball team will represent the University of Dayton during the 2017–18 NCAA Division I women's basketball season. The Flyers, led by second-year head coach Shauna Green, play their home games at UD Arena and are members of the Atlantic 10 Conference. They finished the season 23–7, 15–1 in A-10 play to win the A-10 regular season title. They advanced to the semifinals of the A-10 women's tournament where they lost to George Washington. They received an at-large bid to the NCAA women's tournament where they lost to Marquette in the first round.

Media

Dayton Flyers Sports Network
The Dayton Flyers Sports Network will broadcast Flyers games off of their athletic website, DaytonFlyers.com, with Shane White on the call. Most home games will also be featured on the A-10 Digital Network. Select games will be televised.

Roster

Schedule

|-
!colspan=9 style="background:#; color:white;"| Exhibition

|-
!colspan=9 style="background:#; color:white;"| Non-conference regular season

|-
!colspan=9 style="background:#; color:white;"| Atlantic 10 regular season

|-
!colspan=9 style="background:#; color:white;"| Atlantic 10 Women's Tournament

|-
!colspan=9 style="background:#; color:white;"| NCAA Women's Tournament

Rankings
2017–18 NCAA Division I women's basketball rankings

See also
 2017–18 Dayton Flyers men's basketball team

References

Dayton
Dayton Flyers women's basketball seasons
Dayton
2017 in sports in Ohio
2018 in sports in Ohio